Allomyces anomalus is a species of fungus. A common water mold found throughout Asia and Africa, it is a host of the endoparasite Rozella allomycis.

External links 

 Mycobank entry

References

Fungi described in 1941
Blastocladiomycota